The women's 200 metre backstroke event at the 2018 Commonwealth Games was held on 8 April at the Gold Coast Aquatic Centre.

Records
Prior to this competition, the existing world, Commonwealth and Games records were as follows:

The following records were established during the competition:

Results

Heats
The heats were held at 10:31.

Final
The final was held at 19:37.

References

Women's 200 metre backstroke
Commonwealth Games
Common